Cross Roads is an unincorporated community in Salem Township, Delaware County, Indiana.

History
The first store at Cross Roads opened in 1832. The community was named for the fact two roads meet at the town site.

A post office was established at Cross Roads in 1879, and remained in operation until it was discontinued in 1901.

Geography

References

Unincorporated communities in Delaware County, Indiana
Unincorporated communities in Indiana